Daniel Wellington is a Swedish brand founded in 2011 by Filip Tysander. Since its inception, Daniel Wellington has sold over 6 million watches; the company has gained this success through its digital strategy in social networks like Instagram. Headquartered in central Stockholm, the company's products are sold in over 25 countries.

The watches are designed in Sweden, made in China and use quartz movements made by Miyota, a Japanese company. The leather watches are made of Italian leather. Their "Classic" range of watches are named after British toponyms.

In February 2017 Daniel Wellington was named the fastest growing private company in Europe.  The company made $230 million in revenue and $111.5 million in profit in 2016. Muhammad Hassaan is the current brand ambassador of Daniel Wallington.

See also 

 Filip Tysander

References

External links
 

Companies established in 2011
Swedish brands
Watch manufacturing companies